Berry-growing in Canada is mostly confined to its rainiest areas, although a lesser amount is grown elsewhere. Most berries are grown in southwest British Columbia, except lowbush blueberry which is almost only grown in The Maritimes. Significant amounts of strawberries are grown in southern Ontario, southern Quebec, and the southern part of the Maritimes, and smaller amounts around urban areas of the Prairies. Blueberry is the most important, indeed top among all fruits in the country, by  cultivated area,   farm gate value, CAN$261,532,000  and export value, CAN$422,441,000. Grape (in some ways a berry crop) is third by  cultivated area,   and farm gate, CAN$151,093,000. Cherry (sometimes grouped with berries) is third in export value at CAN$82,841,000

British Columbia 
Common crops include blueberry, strawberry (and grape, often called "berries" in the industry). The Provincial government provides information including production guides for blackberry, blueberry, cranberry, currant, gooseberry, raspberry, and strawberry.

The Pacific North West  including BC  produces much of the world's raspberries.

The Regional District of Bulkley-Nechako recommends sources for information and practices in the area.

Insurance is provided through the province.

Manitoba 

There is no blueberry domesticated industry. Instead semi-wild stands are planted and managed and may form the basis of a larger industry in the future.

The provincial government provides information for production of raspberry.

Saskatoon could be a much larger industry. There is high demand and little supply. The provincial government provides production information.

Strawberry is the berry with the largest acreage in the province. The Strawberry Growers Association of Manitoba was founded in 1972 and is now the Prairie Fruit Growers Association. The provincial government provides production information.

There is only a niche market for currant, gooseberry, highbush cranberry, pincherry, sea buckthorn, and silver buffaloberry. The government provides production recommendations for these bush fruits.

Quebec 
36% of the country's strawberries are grown here, the highest for any province or territory. APFFdQ recommends cultivars for the province.

APFFdQ also recommends raspberry cultivars for the province.

References 

Agriculture in Canada
Berries